Rory O'Reilly (born June 25, 1955) is an American former cyclist. He competed in the 1000m time trial "kilo" event at the 1984 Summer Olympics on a custom bicycle built by Mike Celmins.

References

External links
 

1955 births
Living people
American male cyclists
Olympic cyclists of the United States
Cyclists at the 1984 Summer Olympics
Cyclists from New York (state)
Cyclists at the 1983 Pan American Games
Pan American Games medalists in cycling
Pan American Games gold medalists for the United States
Medalists at the 1983 Pan American Games